Saadatabad-e Molla Hoseyni (also Romanized as Sa‘ādatābād-e Mollā Ḩoseynī; also known as Sa‘ādatābād) is a village in Kuh Mareh Sorkhi Rural District, Arzhan District, Shiraz County, Fars Province, Iran. At the 2006 census, its population was 582, in 109 families.

References 

Populated places in Shiraz County